Fosters is an unincorporated community in Tuscaloosa County, Alabama, United States. Fosters has a post office with ZIP code 35463. Fosters is named in honor of the family of James Foster, who settled in the area in 1818.

References

Unincorporated communities in Tuscaloosa County, Alabama
Unincorporated communities in Alabama